Life in a Year is a 2020 American romantic drama film directed by Mitja Okorn, from a screenplay by Jeffrey Addiss and Will Matthews. The film stars Jaden Smith, Cara Delevingne, Cuba Gooding Jr., and Nia Long. Will Smith and Jada Pinkett Smith serve as executive producers under their Overbrook Entertainment banner.

Life in a Year was released on November 27, 2020, by Sony Pictures Releasing.

Plot
Daryn, who is being groomed to get into Harvard by his father Xavier, meets Isabelle one night while trying to sneak into a rapper’s concert and is instantly drawn to her. He courts and eventually falls in love with her but when Daryn confesses his love, Isabelle reveals that she has cancer and hasn't got much time left.

So, Daryn makes a plan to live a life in a year. Isabelle recognises his potential as a rapper and helps him to make his first demo CD. When Daryn takes her to meet his parents. Xavier, disliking Isabelle, uses the moment to fire questions at her. He concludes by saying it is his responsibility to protect his son from distractions, such as girls; especially those like Isabelle. Feeling offended and rejected, Isabelle and her drag queen, parental figure Phil leave and Daryn is left alone and depressed.

A few days later, Daryn is shortlisted at Harvard and he attends his interview with his father. When asked what skills and abilities he has, he loses himself to memories of Isabelle. To his father's disappointment, he ends up saying worthless things and excuses himself. 

Later at home, Daryn quarrels with his father and is almost punched by him but his mother intervenes and stops the fight. Daryn goes to Isabelle and apologizes, deciding to abandon his family and leave town with Isabelle. 

The two spend days together, and one day Daryn tries to surprise her by drives her to her mother's. He convinces her to talk with her, but when she does, her mother recognizes her but tells her to leave. Feeling rejected, Isabelle asks Daryn to drive away. 

While driving, an upset Isabelle starts yelling and shouting at Daryn, distracting him so he crashes into a bush near the beach. When Isabelle gets out, she goes unconscious. Daryn calls for help, and manages to get Isabelle to the hospital.

A few days after Isabelle is discharged, her mother comes to visit but soon leaves. Daryn's mother discovers that he is back in town and decides to see them. Isabelle suggests that Daryn take a break from taking care of her just for the day, as his mother is around. Daryn uses the opportunity to record his second song. 

When Daryn gets back, he finds his mother panicking and Isabelle on the floor, unconscious and bleeding through her mouth. They get her to the hospital and there, they discover that Isabelle's cancer has spread and her organs are shutting down. The nurse concludes by saying that Isabelle's got only a few weeks left.

Soon after Isabelle is discharged, she surprises Daryn with a wedding. They get married and consummate their love, Isabelle passes away a short time later. Daryn reconciles with his father and moves to New York City to pursue a career in music after graduating.

Cast
 Jaden Smith as Daryn
 Cara Delevingne as Isabelle
 Nia Long as Catherine
 Cuba Gooding Jr. as Xavier
 RZA as Ron
 Michelle Giroux as Amanda
 Chris D'Elia as Phil
 Stony Blyden as Kiran
 JT Neal as Sammy
 Big Sean as himself
 Pedro Miguel Arce as Security Guard

Production
In March 2017, it was announced Cara Delevingne and Jaden Smith had joined the cast of the film, with Mitja Okorn directing from a screenplay by Jeffrey Addiss and Will Matthews. Will Smith and Jada Pinkett Smith will serve as executive producers via their Overbrook Entertainment banner. In April 2017, Terrence Howard, Stony Blyden, Nia Long, RZA and JT Neal joined the cast of the film. In May 2017, Chris D'Elia and Cuba Gooding Jr. joined the cast of the film, with Gooding Jr. replacing Howard.

Filming
Principal photography began in April 2017, in Toronto, Ontario, Canada.

Release
The film was released on November 27, 2020, by Amazon Studios.

References

External links
 

2020 films
2020 romantic drama films
2020s English-language films
2020s teen drama films
2020s teen romance films
Amazon Studios films
American romantic drama films
American teen drama films
American teen romance films
Columbia Pictures films
Films about cancer
Films about death
Films about interracial romance
Films scored by Photek
Films set in Pittsburgh
Films shot in Toronto
Overbrook Entertainment films
Amazon Prime Video original films
2020s American films